American Family Insurance, also abbreviated as AmFam, is an American private mutual company that focuses on property, casualty, and auto insurance, and also offers commercial insurance, life, health, and homeowners coverage as well as investment and retirement-planning products. A Fortune 500 company, its revenues were over $9.5 billion in 2017.

History 
American Family Insurance's history began on October 3, 1927, when insurance salesman Herman Wittwer opened the doors of Farmers Mutual Insurance Company (not to be confused with the Farmers Insurance Group) in Madison, Wisconsin. At the time, the company's only product was auto insurance and its target market was farmers. Wittwer believed farmers presented lower risks than city drivers because they drove less often and not at all in the winter.

Over the years, Farmers Mutual expanded its market and product line to meet the changing needs of its customers. In 1963, Farmers Mutual changed its name to American Family Mutual Insurance Company to reflect its broader customer base. In March, 1995, American Family settled a redlining lawsuit, resulting in a $14.5 million payout to victims. The settlement was negotiated by the US Department of Justice and marked the first use of the federal Fair Housing Act of 1968 to counter discrimination in insurance; at the time it was the most costly insurance-company settlement ever for discrimination charges. In 2017, AmFam launched an ongoing campaigned called DreamFearlessly. AmFam's ambassador's use this as a hashtag on social media to help promote this campaign. The campaign encourages consumers to express how they "dream fearlessly" for initiatives e.g. social justice, getting women into tech, Economic Empowerment. Kathy Ireland and her team were brought on early to help as with ambassador work. Blake Van Leer a close supporter of the Society of Women Engineers helped manage this campaign from its launch.

Subsidiaries 
Companies of the American Family Insurance Group include:
 American Family Mutual Insurance Company (AFMIC)
 American Family Brokerage, Inc. (AFBI)
 American Family Insurance Company of Ohio (AFICO; Ohio subsidiary, companion to American Family Mutual Insurance Company)
 American Family Life Insurance Company (AFLIC)
 American Family Securities, LLC (AFS)
 American Standard Insurance Company (ASIC)
 American Standard Insurance Company of Ohio (ASICO; Ohio subsidiary; companion to American Standard Insurance Company of Wisconsin)
 Amfam.com Inc.(AMFAM)
 CONNECT, powered by American Family Insurance (formerly Ameriprise Auto & Home) 
 HomeGauge® 
 Homesite Group Incorporated 
 Main Street America Insurance
 Moonrise, Inc.
 Networked Insights
 PGC Holdings Corporation (General Insurance Companies "The General®")

Products 
American Family insurance products include: term, universal, and whole life insurance; personal and business auto insurance,
personal umbrella insurance, home insurance; motorcycle, boat, motor home, snowmobile and car insurance; business liability key policy, and business policy package insurance; farm and ranch liability insurance; travel, trip cancellation, and global medical insurance

The company also offers a reward system for their insureds titled "Dreamkeep Rewards," which provides small to large rewards for completing various online tasks.

Operating territory  
The American Family Insurance Group is based in Madison, Wisconsin, and as of 2011 had 4 regional corporate headquarters in Minnetonka/Eden Prairie, Minnesota; Saint Joseph, Missouri; Denver, Colorado; and Columbus, Ohio among others.

Significant milestones 
Below is a list of milestones in the corporate history of American Family Mutual Insurance.

1927 Farmers Mutual Automobile Insurance Company was founded on Oct. 3 in Madison, Wis.
1938 Both premiums and assets surpassed $1 million.
1957 Farmers Mutual began to offer sickness and accident insurance.
1958 Company introduced homeowners insurance and opened American Family Life Insurance Company.
1959 Farmers Mutual entered the computer age with the RAMAC 305.
1961 American Standard began sales.
1962 Company began to offer farm owners insurance.
1963 Policyholders gave final approval to change the company's name to American Family Mutual Insurance Company.
1969 American Family Financial Services opened.
1975 Commercial Lines was introduced. American Family became the fifth-largest mutual auto insurer.
1981 Assets surpass $1 billion. American Family became the fourth-largest mutual auto insurance company.
1985 American Family Brokerage, Inc. opened.
1986  American Family posted its first $100 million operating gain.
1992 Policyholders' surplus exceeded $1 billion.
1994 American Family rolled out its catastrophe trailer. The company ranked as the 11th-largest property/casualty insurer.
1996 American Family first appeared on the Fortune 500 list at number 403.
1997 American Family became the 10th-largest property/casualty insurer in the nation. Assets surpassed $8 billion.
2001 American Family Securities, LLC introduced variable products. Assets for American Family Mutual Insurance Company exceeded $10 billion.
2001 Furthers expansion into Utah and Idaho.  American Family in 17 states across the U.S.
2002 American Family celebrated its 75th anniversary.
2003 American Family donated $10,000,000.00 towards construction of the future UW Children's Hospital, to be named American Family Children's Hospital.
2006 Furthers expansion into Washington State.  American Family in 18 states across the U.S.
2009 Furthers expansion into Georgia.  American Family in 19 states across U.S.
2012 American Family Insurance completes its acquisition of The General Insurance
2013 American Family Insurance completes its acquisition of Homesite Insurance
2016 Became the inaugural jersey sponsor of the 2017 MLS expansion team Atlanta United FC
2017 American Family Insurance completes its acquisition of HomeGauge® and Networked Insights
2018 American Family completes merger with Florida-based insurance company, Main Street America Insurance
2019 American Family Insurance completes its acquisition of Ameriprise Auto & Home
2021 American Family Insurance becomes the naming rights sponsor of the stadium of the Milwaukee Brewers, American Family Field.

Awards 
In 2010, National Safety Council selected American Family Insurance as a recipient of its Teen Driving Safety Leadership Award. Through its “Teen Safe Driver Program,” the company has provided, a video feedback program (using the DriveCam system) in which parents can watch the actual driving actions of their teens. The program was validated by scientists at the University of Iowa to produce a 70% reduction in risky driving behavior. In 2015, American Family was recognized as the most LGBT-friendly insurance company by Out Magazine because of its discounts targeted at same-sex couples.

Ambassadors 
American Family Insurance has a unique ambassador program to inspire and encourage people to pursue their dreams. Notable ambassadors include: 
Kathy Ireland an American model and actress turned author and entrepreneur.
Derek Jeter an American former professional baseball shortstop, businessman, and baseball executive.
Christian Yelich is an American professional baseball outfielder for the Milwaukee Brewers of Major League Baseball (MLB). 
Drew and Jonathan Scott, are renowned talents in television, best-selling authors, designers, co-founders of Scott Brothers Global and more. 
Steve Stricker is an American professional golfer who plays on the PGA Tour and the PGA Tour Champions. 
J. J. Watt an American football defensive end for the Arizona Cardinals of the National Football League. (Former Ambassador)
Brad Guzan an American soccer player who plays as a goalkeeper for Major League Soccer club Atlanta United FC (where the company serves as its main sponsor) and the United States national team.
Kevin Durant an American professional basketball player for the Brooklyn Nets of the National Basketball Association. (Former Ambassador)
John Legend an American singer, songwriter, producer, actor, and philanthropist. (Former Ambassador)

Charitable contributions

American Family Children’s Hospital 
On March 4, 2003, American Family Insurance announced a $10 million gift launching the campaign to create the American Family Children's Hospital at the University of Wisconsin Hospital and Clinics.  From that initial gift, the amount grew by several millions more through employee, agent and additional corporate donations. The hospital opened for business in September 2007.

United Way 
In 2007, and again in 2008, employees donated close to $1 million to United Way.

Covid-19 pandemic support 
In April 2020, the company estimates the refunds to reflect $225 million in liquidity, contributing to the $200 million gain on personal insurance holders' premiums. American Family Insurance provides an additional COVID-19 pandemic mitigation premium of 10% on car policies.

References

External links
American Family Insurance website

Insurance companies of the United States
Mutual insurance companies of the United States
Companies based in Madison, Wisconsin
American companies established in 1927
Financial services companies established in 1927
1927 establishments in Wisconsin